Doryonychus is a monotypic genus of Hawaiian long-jawed orb-weavers containing the single species, Doryonychus raptor. It was first described by Eugène Louis Simon in 1900, and is known only from the Hawaiian island of Kauai.

See also
 List of Tetragnathidae species

References

Monotypic Araneomorphae genera
Spiders of Asia
Tetragnathidae